In enzymology, a GDP-glucosidase is an enzyme that catalyzes the chemical reaction

GDP-glucose + H2O  D-glucose + GDP

Thus, the two substrates of this enzyme are GDP-glucose and H2O, whereas its two products are D-glucose and GDP.

This enzyme belongs to the family of hydrolases, specifically those glycosidases that hydrolyse O- and S-glycosyl compounds.  The systematic name of this enzyme class is GDP-glucose glucohydrolase. Other names in common use include guanosine diphosphoglucosidase, and guanosine diphosphate D-glucose glucohydrolase.

References

 

EC 3.2.1
Enzymes of unknown structure